Salvador Bermúdez de Castro y O'Lawlor, 2nd Duke of Ripalda, Marquis of Lema (1 November 1863, in Madrid – 20 January 1945) was a Spanish noble, politician and lawyer who served as Minister of State during the reign of Alfonso XIII.

Biography 
He was born in Madrid, the son of Manuel Bermúdez de Castro y Díez (1811–1870) a senator and Minister for the Interior and Foreign Affairs, and María de la Encarnación O’Lawlor y Caballero (1830-1908), youngest daughter of Joseph O'Lawlor (1768–1850), an Irish-born Spanish general and governor of Granada. His cousin Richard Lalor was an Irish nationalist member of the British House of Commons. He married María, a daughter of Joaquín Sánchez de Toca y Calvo and María Ballester y Bueno.

The Duke was a prominent Spanish author, conservative politician and nobleman. He inherited the Dukedom of Ripalda and the Marquessate of Lema from his paternal uncle. A deputy for Oviedo (1891–1923), he served as Minister for Foreign Affairs 1919–21, 1917, 1913–15; Mayor of Madrid 1903–4 and Governor of the Bank of Spain (1922–3).

He was the author of numerous works including "De la Revolución a la Restauración", "Spain since 1815" and the autobiographical "Mis Recuerdos 1801-1901".

References

Foreign ministers of Spain
Marquesses of Spain
Dukes in the Kingdom of The Two Sicilies
1863 births
1945 deaths
Conservative Party (Spain) politicians
Mayors of Madrid
Governors of the Bank of Spain